The 1989 Miami Dolphins season was the team's 24th as a member of the National Football League (NFL). The Dolphins improved upon their previous season's 6–10 W-L record, winning eight games. Despite this improvement they failed to qualify for the playoffs for the fourth consecutive season, tying the longest such record in franchise history when the Dolphins failed to make the playoffs from 1966 to 1969. This was also the longest such record for coach Don Shula in his NFL career.

Shortly after the season ended, Miami Dolphins founder Joe Robbie died on January 7, 1990, at the age of 73.

This was the first of 15 consecutive non-losing seasons for the Dolphins.

Personnel

Staff

Roster

Regular season

Schedule 

Note: Intra-division opponents are in bold text.

Standings

Season summary

Week 1

References 

Miami Dolphins seasons
Miami Dolphins
Miami Dolphins